Newton County is a county located near the northwestern corner of the U.S. state of Indiana.  As of 2010, the population was 14,244. This county is part of Northwest Indiana as well as the Chicago metropolitan area.  The county seat is Kentland. The county is divided into 10 townships which provide local services.

History 
The original Newton County was formed by statute on February 7, 1835, and was a roughly square area some 30 miles on a side, encompassing what is now the northern half of the county, the northern half of Jasper County, and a large section to the north.  The northern border was cut back to the Kankakee River on February 1, 1836, with all land north of the Kankakee River going to Lake and Porter counties. The county was abolished and combined with Jasper County in 1839. On December 8, 1859, the county was re-created and the borders were redrawn to essentially their current state.

Newton County is named after Sgt. John Newton, who served under Gen. Francis Marion (the "Swamp Fox") in the American Revolutionary War.  It is adjacent to Jasper County, which was named after Sgt. William Jasper, whose story is similar.  At least four other states, Georgia, Mississippi, Missouri and Texas, have adjacent Jasper and Newton Counties, as though these two were remembered as a pair.

Upon its re-creation, Newton County was the last of Indiana's 92 counties to be organized.

Geography 

Newton County is the site of the Kentland crater, a probable meteorite impact crater located between Kentland and Goodland.

J.C. Murphy Lake is at the center of Willow Slough Fish and Wildlife Area.

Major highways
  Interstate 65
  U.S. Route 24
  U.S. Route 41
  U.S. Route 52
  State Road 10
  State Road 14
  State Road 16
  State Road 55
  State Road 71
  State Road 114

Railroads
 CSX Transportation
 Toledo, Peoria and Western Railway

Adjacent counties
 Lake County  (north)
 Jasper County  (east)
 Benton County  (south/ET Border)
 Iroquois County, Illinois (west)
 Kankakee County, Illinois (northwest)

Municipalities
The municipalities in Newton County, and their populations as of the 2010 Census, are:

Towns

Census-designated places

Other unincorporated places

Townships
The 10 townships of Newton County, with their housing units as of the 2010 Census, are:

Climate and weather 

Government 

The county government is a constitutional body granted specific powers by the Constitution of Indiana and the Indiana Code.  The county council is the legislative branch of the county government and controls all spending and revenue collection. Representatives are elected from county districts. The council members serve four-year terms and are responsible for setting salaries, the annual budget and special spending. The council also has limited authority to impose local taxes, in the form of an income and property tax that is subject to state level approval, excise taxes and service taxes.

The executive body of the county is made of a board of commissioners. The commissioners are elected county-wide, in staggered terms, and each serves a four-year term. One of the commissioners, typically the most senior, serves as president. The commissioners are charged with executing the acts legislated by the council, collecting revenue and managing day-to-day functions of the county government.

The county maintains a small claims court that can handle some civil cases. The judge on the court is elected to a term of four years and must be a member of the Indiana Bar Association. The judge is assisted by a constable who is elected to a four-year term. In some cases, court decisions can be appealed to the state level circuit court.

The county has several other elected offices, including sheriff, coroner, auditor, treasurer, recorder, surveyor and circuit court clerk. Each of these elected officers serves a term of four years and oversees a different part of county government. Members elected to county government positions are required to declare party affiliations and be residents of the county.

Each of the townships has a trustee who administers rural fire protection and ambulance service, provides poor relief and manages cemetery care, among other duties.  The trustee is assisted in these duties by a three-member township board.  The trustees and board members are elected to four-year terms.

Newton County is part of Indiana's 4th congressional district. It is part of Indiana Senate district 6 and Indiana House of Representatives districts 15 and 19.

Demographics 

As of the 2010 United States Census, there were 14,244 people, 5,503 households, and 3,945 families residing in the county. The racial makeup of the county was 96.2% white, 0.4% black or African American, 0.3% Asian, 0.3% American Indian, 1.8% from other races, and 1.1% from two or more races. Those of Hispanic or Latino origin made up 5.0% of the population. In terms of ancestry, 30.4% were German, 16.9% were Irish, 11.0% were English, 8.1% were Polish, 7.6% were Dutch, and 6.5% were American.

Of the 5,503 households, 31.1% had children under the age of 18 living with them, 57.3% were married couples living together, 8.7% had a female householder with no husband present, 28.3% were non-families, and 23.8% of all households were made up of individuals. The average household size was 2.56 and the average family size was 3.00. The median age was 42.4 years.

The median income for a household in the county was $47,697 and the median income for a family was $60,242. Males had a median income of $45,389 versus $29,891 for females. The per capita income for the county was $24,055. About 4.8% of families and 8.2% of the population were below the poverty line, including 12.0% of those under age 18 and 5.3% of those age 65 or over.

Education 
Public schools in Newton County are administered by two districts:
 North Newton School Corporation 
 South Newton School Corporation 

High Schools and Middle Schools
 North Newton Junior-Senior High School 
 South Newton High School 
 South Newton Middle School 

Elementary Schools
 Lake Village Elementary School 
 Lincoln Elementary School 
 Morocco Elementary School 
 South Newton Elementary School

See also

 National Register of Historic Places listings in Newton County, Indiana

Bibliography

References

External links 
 

 
Indiana counties
1859 establishments in Indiana
Chicago metropolitan area
Northwest Indiana
Populated places established in 1859